Chisholm Trail Academy (CTA) is a Seventh-day Adventist       co-educational high school located at Fourth and Old Betsy in Keene, Texas.

Facilities
Facilities include two sports fields, a gymnasium with a stage, 15 classrooms, a library, an industrial vocational building, an administrative complex, four bathrooms, and a music hall

History
Chisholm Trail Academy came into existence when Southwestern Junior College (now Southwestern Adventist University) was granted full college status and closed its academy operation in 1967.  Chisholm Trail Academy's first graduating class was in 1968.

Curriculum
The schools curriculum consists primarily of the standard courses taught at college preparatory schools across the world. All students are required to take classes in the core areas of English, Basic Sciences, Mathematics, a Foreign Language, and Social Sciences.

Spiritual aspects
All students take religion classes each year that they are enrolled. These classes cover topics in biblical history and Christian and denominational doctrines. Instructors in other disciplines also begin each class period with prayer or a short devotional thought, many which encourage student input. Weekly, the entire student body gathers together in the auditorium for an hour-long chapel service.
Outside the classrooms there is year-round spiritually oriented programming that relies on student involvement.

See also

 List of Seventh-day Adventist secondary schools
 Seventh-day Adventist education

References

External links

Educational institutions established in 1967
Private high schools in Texas
Adventist secondary schools in the United States
Schools in Johnson County, Texas
1967 establishments in Texas